Turnor Lake 194 is an Indian reserve of the Birch Narrows Dene Nation in Saskatchewan. It is 84 kilometers northwest of Île-à-la-Crosse.

References

Indian reserves in Saskatchewan